Lackey is an unincorporated community in Floyd County, Kentucky, United States. Lackey was home to a pack horse library as part of the Pack Horse Library Project in the late 1930s and early 1940s.

References

Unincorporated communities in Floyd County, Kentucky
Coal towns in Kentucky
Unincorporated communities in Kentucky